Eroc or EROC may refer to

 East Rutherford Operations Center, a facility of the Federal Reserve Bank of New York
 Enterprise Resource Outline Code,  a concept in project management
 Eroc, stage name of German musician Joachim Heinz Ehrig
 EROC Australia, End Rape on Campus (Australia), major supporter of the #LetHerSpeak campaign
 Ethical Research Oversight Course, an online course